Altay Prefecture is located in the Northern Xinjiang, People's Republic of China. It is a part of Ili Kazakh Autonomous Prefecture. At the 2000 census, Altay was the only major subdivision of Ili Kazakh Autonomous Prefecture with an ethnic Kazakh majority (about 51%). In 2007, it had a GDP of RMB 9.9 billion with a 12% growth rate. It also shares an international border with the neighboring Altai Republic, located within Russia.

Subdivisions 
The prefecture is divided into 1 county-level city and 6 counties.

Demographics

Administration 

Secretary of the Party Committee 
 Zhang Yan 
 Mar.2017-

Administrative Commissioner
 Mawken Seyitqamzaüli 2003 - 2007
 Aitzhanuly Sabir
 Talgat Usen :zh:塔里哈提·吾逊 2012? — 1 April 2017 
 Qadan Käbenuly 1 April 2017 — April 2021
 Jaynes Hades
 Aydyn Toleukhanuly

References

 
Prefecture-level divisions of Xinjiang